Isoflavenes are a type of isoflavonoids.

Examples 
 Glabrene, found in the roots of liquorice, is also a xenoestrogen.
 2-Methoxyjudaicin found in the roots of Cicer bijugum
 Haginin D
 Idronoxil, also known as phenoxodiol, which is used for anticancer purposes.

References 

Isoflavonoids